Australofannia spiniclunis is a fly species in the Fanniidae family. It is the only known species of the genus Australofannia from Southeastern Australia. The species was first described by the English entomologist Adrian C. Pont in 1977.

References

Fanniidae
Insects described in 1977
Diptera of Australasia